Betty Joel (née Mary Stewart Lockhart; 7 June 1894, Hong Kong – 21 January 1985, Hampshire) was a British furniture, textile and interior designer, active in England from  1921 until 1937. Her work was featured in The Studio, the illustrated fine arts and decorative arts magazine, from 1927 to 1937. Examples of her work can be seen in the Victoria & Albert Museum, London and the Geffrye Museum, London.

Early life 
The daughter of James Stewart Lockhart, KCMG, LLD (1858–1937) and Edith Louise Rider (née Hancock) (1870–1950), Joel who was called by the name Betty from a young age, was born in Hong Kong, where her father was an administrator. She met her future husband, David Joel (1891–1973), a naval officer in Ceylon, returning to England together after the end of the First World War.

Career 

Without any formal training, she started her own business Betty Joel Ltd. with her husband David Joel, with a furniture workshop, initially located on Hayling Island and retailing through her shop in Sloane Street.
She began to design furniture, using the expertise of the local craftsmen from around local area who had previously worked as yacht fitters and specialized the traditional boat building woods, oak and teak.

The designs were first retailed through their showroom in London at 177 Sloane Street and then at 25 Knightsbridge.  The larger premises allowed them to show a wider range of items and to hold art exhibitions.  Exhibitions included rugs by Ivan da Silva Bruhns, the French artist, drawings by Matisse and paintings by Marie Laurencin.

She began to design her own rugs which she had made in Tianjin, China and textiles which were manufactured in France.  Her work in both furniture and textiles was distinctive for the use of curved lines and curvilinear shapes.

In 1938 she created a study for Lord Mountbatten's Park Lane, London home and  a bedroom for the 2nd Countess of Iveagh at Elveden Hall.  Other commissions included work for the Savoy and the St James's Palace Hotel, and for the then Duchess of York.

With the breakdown of their marriage in 1939, Betty retired from the design business and did not work again. David Joel continued the business renaming it David Joel Ltd.

An Art Deco bed headboard designed by Betty Joel in 1929 was featured in a 2013 episode of the BBC's Antiques Road Trip (series 7, episode 16).

Exhibitions 
London: Royal Academy of Arts (1935), Exhibition of British Art in Industry
 New York: Metropolitan Museum of Art (1937), Rugs and carpets: An International Exhibition of Contemporary Industrial Art
Brighton: Royal Pavilion, Art Gallery & Museums (1975) British Carpets and Designs: The Modernist Rug 1928-1938 cat no 8

References

Further reading

External links 
 

 Portrait 

1894 births
1985 deaths
British designers
British interior designers